The Bengal Legislative Assembly was the largest legislature in British India, serving as the lower chamber of the legislature of Bengal (now Bangladesh and the Indian state of West Bengal). It was established under the Government of India Act 1935. The assembly played an important role in the final decade of undivided Bengal. The Leader of the House was the Prime Minister of Bengal. The assembly's lifespan covered the anti-feudal movement of the Krishak Praja Party, the period of World War II, the Lahore Resolution, the Quit India movement, suggestions for a United Bengal and the partition of Bengal and partition of British India.

Many notable speeches were delivered by Bengali statesmen in this assembly. The records of the assembly's proceedings are preserved in the libraries of the Parliament of Bangladesh and the West Bengal Legislative Assembly.

History

The assembly was the culmination of legislative development in Bengal which started in 1861 with the Bengal Legislative Council. The Government of India Act 1935 made the council the upper chamber, while the 250-seat legislative assembly was formed as the elected lower chamber. The act did not grant universal suffrage, instead in line with the Communal Award, it created separate electorates as the basis of electing the assembly. The first elections took place in 1937. The Congress party emerged as the single largest party but refused to form a government due to its policy of boycotting legislatures. The Krishak Praja Party and Bengal Provincial Muslim League, supported by several independent legislators, formed the first government. A. K. Fazlul Huq became the first prime minister. Huq supported the League's Lahore Resolution in 1940, which called on the imperial government to include the eastern zone of British India in a future sovereign homeland for Muslims. The text of the resolution initially seemed to support the notion of an independent state in Bengal and Assam. The Krishak Praja Party implemented measures to curtail the influence of the landed gentry. Prime Minister Huq used both legal and administrative measures to relieve the debts of peasants and farmers. According to the historian Ayesha Jalal, the Bengali Muslim population was keen for a Bengali-Assamese sovereign state and an end to the permanent settlement.

In 1941, the League withdrew support for Huq after he joined the Viceroy's defense council against the wishes of the League's president Jinnah. Jinnah felt the council's membership was detrimental to partitioning India; but Huq was joined on the council by the Prime Minister of the Punjab, Sir Sikandar Hayat Khan. In Bengal, Huq secured the support of Syama Prasad Mukherjee, the leader of the Hindu Mahasabha, and formed a second coalition government. Sir Khawaja Nazimuddin, a trusted confidante of Jinnah, became Leader of the Opposition. In 1943, the Huq ministry fell and Nazimuddin formed a Muslim League government.

Amid the outbreak of world war, Rabindranath Tagore urged Prime Minister Nazimuddin to arrange for the release of Alex Aronson, a German citizen and Jewish lecturer in Santiniketan who was interned by the British colonial authority. Tagore had earlier requested the central home ministry of India to release Aronson but the request was turned down. Tagore then wrote a letter to Prime Minister Nazimuddin in Bengal. Prime Minister Nazimuddin intervened and secured the release of the lecturer.

Nazimuddin led conservative elements in the Bengal Provincial Muslim League. As World War II intensified and Imperial Japan attacked Bengal from Burma, the provincial government grappled with the Bengal famine of 1943. Hindu-Muslim relations continued to deteriorate, particularly during the Congress's Quit India movement. The next general election was delayed for two years. The Nazimuddin ministry became unpopular. Governor's rule was imposed between March 1945 and April 1946. Factional infighting within the Bengal Provincial Muslim League displaced the Nazimuddin faction; and the centre-left H. S. Suhrawardy-led faction took control of the provincial party.

The 1946 general election was won by the Bengal Provincial Muslim League. The League received its largest mandate in Bengal, compared to smaller mandates in other Muslim majority provinces in India. The result was interpreted as an equivocal approval of the Pakistan movement. Suhrawardy was appointed prime minister. Suhrawardy's frosty relations with Jinnah affected his ambitions of achieving a United Bengal, though both men wanted Calcutta to remain within an undivided Bengal. The Noakhali riots and the violence of Direct Action Day contributed to the government's stand on partitioning Bengal. Despite support from Bengali Hindu leaders like Sarat Chandra Bose and the Governor of Bengal, Suhrawardy's proposals were not heeded by Earl Mountbatten and Nehru. The Hindu Mahasabha's legislators in the assembly demanded the partition of Bengal.

Eve of partition
On 20 June 1947, the Bengal Legislative Assembly met to decide on the partition of Bengal. At the preliminary joint meeting, it was decided by 120 votes to 90 that the province, if it remained united, should join the "new Constituent Assembly" (Pakistan). At a separate meeting of legislators from West Bengal, it was decided by 58 votes to 21 that the province should be partitioned and that West Bengal should join the "existing Constituent Assembly" (India). At a separate meeting of legislators from East Bengal, it was decided by 106 votes to 35 that the province should not be partitioned and 107 votes to 34 that East Bengal should join the Constituent Assembly
of Pakistan in the event of partition. On 6 July 1947, the region of Sylhet in Assam voted in a referendum to join East Bengal.

Seats
The allocation of 250 seats in the assembly was based on the communal award. It is illustrated in the following.

 General elected seats- 78
 Muslim electorate seats- 117
 Urban seats- 6
 Rural seats- 111
 Anglo-Indian electorate seats- 3
 European electorate seats- 11
 Indian Christian electorate seats- 2
 Commerce, Industries and Planting seats- 19
 Port of Calcutta
 Port of Chittagong
 Bengal Chamber of Commerce
 Jute Interest
 Tea Interest
 Railways
 Traders Associations
 Others
 Zamindar seats- 5
 Labour representatives- 8
 Education seats- 2
 University of Calcutta- 1
 University of Dacca- 1
 Women seats- 5
 General electorate- 2
 Muslim electorate- 2
 Anglo-Indian electorate- 1

Elections
The following results are recorded by the Asiatic Society of Bangladesh.

1937 general election

1946 general election

Ministries

First Huq ministry
The first ministry was formed by Prime Minister A. K. Fazlul Huq lasted between 1 April 1937 and 1 December 1941. Huq himself held the portfolio of Education, Sir Khawaja Nazimuddin was Home Minister, H. S. Suhrawardy was Commerce and Labour Minister, Nalini Ranjan Sarkar was Finance Minister, Sir Bijay Prasad Singh Roy was Revenue Minister, Khwaja Habibullah was Agriculture and Industry Minister, Srish Chandra Nandy was Irrigation, Works and Communications Minister, Prasana Deb Raikut was Forest and Excise Minister, Mukunda Behari Mallick was Cooperative, Credit and Rural Indebtedness Minister, Nawab Musharraf Hussain was Judicial and Legislature Minister and Syed Nausher Ali was Public Health and Local Self Government Minister.

Second Huq ministry
The second Huq ministry lasted between 12 December 1941 and 29 March 1943. It was known as the Shyama-Huq coalition.

Nazimuddin ministry
The Nazimuddin ministry lasted between 29 April 1943 and 31 March 1945.

Suhrawardy ministry
The Suhrawardy ministry lasted between 23 April 1946 and 14 August 1947. Suhrawardy was himself Home Minister. Mohammad Ali of Bogra was Finance, Health and Local Self Government Minister. Syed Muazzemuddin Hossain was Education Minister. Ahmed Hossain was Agriculture, Forest and Fisheries Minister. Nagendra Nath Roy was Judicial and Legislative Minister. Abul Fazal Muhammad Abdur Rahman was Cooperatives and Irrigation Minister. Abul Gofran was Civil Supplies Minister. Tarak Nath Mukherjee was Waterways Minister. Fazlur Rahman was Land Minister. Dwarka Nath Barury was Works Minister.

Speaker of the assembly
The legislative assembly elected its own Speaker. Sir Azizul Haque was the first speaker of the assembly. His successors included Syed Nausher Ali and Nurul Amin.

See also
 House of Commons
 British Indian Empire

References

1937 establishments in British India
1947 disestablishments in British India
Bengal Presidency
West Bengal Legislative Assembly
Historical legislatures in Bangladesh
Historical state legislatures in India